Sid Ahmed Benamara (born July 9, 1973) is an Algerian former international football player. He took part in the 1998 African Cup of Nations.

Honours
 Won the Algerian Cup with MC Oran in 1996
 Won the Algerian League Cup with MC Oran in 1996
 Won the Arab Cup Winners Cup twice with MC Oran in 1997 and 1998

References

External links
 

1973 births
Living people
Algerian footballers
Algeria international footballers
1998 African Cup of Nations players
ASM Oran players
MC Oran players
JSM Béjaïa players
ES Mostaganem players
Association football midfielders
21st-century Algerian people